The following is a timeline of the COVID-19 pandemic in Zhejiang for the year 2021.

Timeline

January
On January 1, 2021, the Zhejiang Provincial Health Commission reported that from 00:00 to 24:00 on December 31, 2020, there were 4 new cases of asymptomatic infection (including 3 cases imported from Nigeria and 1 case imported from Tanzania), and no new confirmed cases cases.

On January 6, the Zhejiang Provincial Health and Health Commission reported that from 0:00 to 24:00 on January 5, there was one new case of asymptomatic infection (imported from Spain), and no new confirmed cases.

On January 7, the Zhejiang Provincial Health and Health Commission reported that from 0:00 to 24:00 on January 6, there was one new case of asymptomatic infection (imported from the UK), and no new confirmed cases.

On January 7, the Information Office of the Zhejiang Provincial Government held the 60th press conference. As of 24:00 on January 6, Zhejiang had no new local confirmed cases for 204 consecutive days; there are currently 9 confirmed cases in hospital. ; 25 cases of asymptomatic infection are still under medical observation, including 24 cases imported from abroad.

On January 8, the Zhejiang Provincial Health and Health Commission notified that there were 5 new cases of asymptomatic infection between 00:00 and 24:00 on January 7 (including 2 cases imported from Nigeria, 1 case imported from Germany, 1 case imported from Egypt, and 1 case imported from Chad) ), with no new confirmed cases.

On January 9, the Zhejiang Provincial Health and Health Commission reported that from 0:00 to 24:00 on January 8, there was one new case of asymptomatic infection (imported from Tanzania), and no new confirmed cases.

On January 10, the Zhejiang Provincial Health and Health Commission reported that from 0:00 to 24:00 on January 9, 2 new confirmed cases (both asymptomatic infections imported from abroad were confirmed).

On January 13, the Zhejiang Provincial Health and Health Commission reported that there were 2 new cases of asymptomatic infection from 00:00 to 24:00 on January 12 (including 1 imported from Japan and 1 imported from Israel), and no new confirmed cases.

On January 14, the Zhejiang Provincial Health and Health Commission reported that from 0:00 to 24:00 on January 13, there was one new case of asymptomatic infection (imported from Shijiazhuang, Hebei Province), and no new confirmed cases.

On January 15, the Zhejiang Provincial Health and Health Commission reported that from 0:00 to 24:00 on January 14, 1 new confirmed case was confirmed (it was an asymptomatic infection previously imported from Japan).

On January 17, the Zhejiang Provincial Health and Health Commission reported that from 0:00 to 24:00 on January 16, there were 3 new cases of asymptomatic infection (including 1 case imported from Egypt, 1 case imported from Germany, and 1 case imported from Spain), and there were no new confirmed cases.

On January 18, the Zhejiang Provincial Health and Health Commission reported that from 0:00 to 24:00 on January 17, there were 2 new confirmed cases (both asymptomatic infections imported from abroad were transferred to confirmed cases), and 1 new asymptomatic infection (Italian input).

On January 19, the Zhejiang Provincial Health and Health Commission reported that from 0:00 to 24:00 on January 18, 3 new confirmed cases (among them, 1 case was confirmed from an asymptomatic infection imported from abroad, 1 case was imported from Spain, and 1 case was imported from the United States).

On January 20, the Zhejiang Provincial Health and Health Commission reported that from 0:00 to 24:00 on January 19, there were 2 new confirmed cases (including 1 imported from Spain and 1 imported from the United States), and 2 new asymptomatic infections (including Egypt imported 1 case, Brazil imported 1 case).

On January 22, the Zhejiang Provincial Health Commission reported that from 0:00 to 24:00 on January 21, there were 3 new cases of asymptomatic infection (including 1 case imported from India, 1 case imported from Spain, and 1 case imported from Brazil), and there were no new confirmed cases.

On January 22, the Zhejiang Provincial Government Information Office held the 62nd press conference. As of 24:00 on January 21, Zhejiang had no new local confirmed cases for 219 consecutive days; there are 10 confirmed cases in hospital. 28 cases of asymptomatic infection are still under medical observation, of which 26 cases were imported from abroad.

On January 23, the Zhejiang Provincial Health Commission reported that from 0:00 to 24:00 on January 22, there was one new case of asymptomatic infection (imported from Iraq), and no new confirmed cases.

On January 24, the Zhejiang Provincial Health and Health Commission reported that there were 2 new asymptomatic infections from 00:00 to 24:00 on January 23 (including 1 imported from Brazil and 1 imported from India), and no new confirmed cases.

On January 25, the Zhejiang Provincial Health Commission reported that from 0:00 to 24:00 on January 24, there were 2 new asymptomatic infections (including 1 imported from Italy and 1 imported from Spain), and no new confirmed cases.

On January 27, the Zhejiang Provincial Health and Health Commission reported that from 0:00 to 24:00 on January 26, there was one new case of asymptomatic infection (imported from Romania), and no new confirmed cases.

On January 29, the Zhejiang Provincial Health and Health Commission reported that from 00:00 to 24:00 on January 28, there were 3 new cases of asymptomatic infection (including 1 case imported from India, 1 case imported from Romania, and 1 case imported from Indonesia), and there were no new confirmed cases.

On January 29, the Information Office of the Zhejiang Provincial Government held the 63rd press conference. As of 24:00 on January 28, Zhejiang had 12 confirmed cases in hospital; 36 cases of asymptomatic infections were still under medical observation, of which 34 cases were imported from abroad.

On January 30, the Zhejiang Provincial Health and Health Commission reported that from 0:00 to 24:00 on January 29, there was one new case of asymptomatic infection (imported from Indonesia), and no new confirmed cases.

On January 31, the Zhejiang Provincial Health and Health Commission reported that from 0:00 to 24:00 on January 30, there was one new case of asymptomatic infection (imported from South Korea), and no new confirmed cases.

February
On February 2, the Zhejiang Provincial Health Commission reported that from 0:00 to 24:00 on February 1, there was one new case of asymptomatic infection (imported from Malaysia), and no new confirmed cases.

On February 3, the Zhejiang Provincial Health and Health Commission reported that from 0:00 to 24:00 on February 2, there was one new case of asymptomatic infection (imported from Hong Kong), and no new confirmed cases.

On February 4, the Zhejiang Provincial Health and Health Commission reported that from 0:00 to 24:00 on February 3, there were 2 new cases of asymptomatic infection (both imported from Brazil), and no new confirmed cases.

On February 6, the Zhejiang Provincial Health Commission reported that from 0:00 to 24:00 on February 5, there was one new case of asymptomatic infection (imported from India), and no new confirmed cases.

On February 7, the Zhejiang Provincial Health and Health Commission reported that from 0:00 to 24:00 on February 6, there was one new case of asymptomatic infection (imported from the Netherlands), and no new confirmed cases.

On February 8, the Zhejiang Provincial Health and Health Commission reported that there were 3 new cases of asymptomatic infection between 00:00 and 24:00 on February 7 (among them, 1 case was imported from Kazakhstan, 1 case was imported from Spain, and 1 case was imported from Henan Province).
No new confirmed cases.

On February 8, the Information Office of the Zhejiang Provincial Government held the 63rd press conference. As of 24:00 on February 7, there were 9 confirmed cases in the province; 43 asymptomatic infections were still under medical observation. cases, of which 41 cases were imported from abroad.

On February 9th, the Zhejiang Provincial Health and Health Commission reported that from 00:00 to 24:00 on February 8th, one new confirmed case was confirmed (it was an asymptomatic infection previously imported from Spain).

March
On March 4, the Zhejiang Provincial Health Commission reported that from 00:00 on March 3 to 24:00, there was 1 new confirmed case (imported from Egypt) and 2 new asymptomatic infections (including 1 imported from Algeria and 1 imported from Iran).

On March 6, the Zhejiang Provincial Health and Health Commission reported that from 00:00 to 24:00 on March 5, there was one new case of asymptomatic infection (imported from Egypt), and no new confirmed cases.

On March 12, the Zhejiang Provincial Health Commission reported that from 00:00 to 24:00 on March 11, there were 3 new cases of asymptomatic infection (including 2 cases imported from Indonesia and 1 case imported from Serbia), and no new confirmed cases.

On March 13, the Zhejiang Provincial Health Commission reported that from 0:00 to 24:00 on March 12, there were 2 new cases of asymptomatic infection (both imported from Ghana), and no new confirmed cases.

On March 15, the Zhejiang Provincial Government Information Office held the 68th press conference. On March 14, there were no new confirmed cases or asymptomatic infections in Zhejiang. As of 24:00 on March 14, Zhejiang had 3 confirmed cases in hospital and 31 asymptomatic cases under medical observation, all imported from abroad.

April
On April 2, the Zhejiang Provincial Health and Health Commission reported that from 04:00 on April 1, there were 2 new cases of asymptomatic infection (including 1 case imported from Turkey and 1 case imported from Indonesia), and no new confirmed cases.

On April 2, the Zhejiang Provincial Government Information Office held the 70th press conference. As of 24:00 on April 1, there were 2 confirmed cases in Zhejiang Province, and 26 cases of asymptomatic infections were still under medical observation, all imported from abroad.

On April 3, the Zhejiang Provincial Health Commission reported that from 04:00 on April 2, there was one new case of asymptomatic infection (imported from Indonesia), and no new confirmed cases.

On April 5, the Zhejiang Provincial Health and Health Commission reported that from 04:00 on April 4, there was 1 new confirmed case (imported from the United States).

On April 9, the Zhejiang Provincial Health Commission reported that from 00:00 to 24:00 on April 8, there was one new case of asymptomatic infection (imported from Indonesia), and no new confirmed cases.

May
On May 1, the Zhejiang Provincial Health Commission reported that from 00:00 to 24:00 on April 30, there was 1 new confirmed case (imported from India) and 1 new case of asymptomatic infection (imported from Hungary).

On May 2, the Zhejiang Provincial Health and Health Commission reported that from 04:00 on May 1, there were 2 new cases of asymptomatic infection (including 1 imported from Bangladesh and 1 imported from Niger), and no new confirmed cases.

On May 7, the Zhejiang Provincial Health Commission reported that from 04:00 on May 6, there were 3 new cases of asymptomatic infection (including 1 case imported from Chad, 1 case imported from Sudan, and 1 case imported from Cameroon), and there were no new confirmed cases.

On May 8, the Zhejiang Provincial Health and Health Commission reported that from 00:00 to 24:00 on May 7, one new confirmed case was confirmed (the asymptomatic infected person imported from Chad was re-designated as a confirmed case).

On May 10, the Zhejiang Provincial Health and Health Commission reported that from 0:00 to 24:00 on May 9, there was 1 new confirmed case (imported from Nigeria) and 1 new asymptomatic infection (imported from Spain).

On May 10, the Information Office of the Zhejiang Provincial Government held the 72nd press conference. As of 24:00 on May 9, there were 22 confirmed cases in Zhejiang Province who were hospitalized and 24 asymptomatic infections were still under medical observation. For example, all imported from abroad.

June
On June 2, the Zhejiang Provincial Health Commission reported that from 0:00 to 24:00 on June 1, there was one new case of asymptomatic infection (imported from Brazil), and no new confirmed cases.

On June 3, the Zhejiang Provincial Health Commission reported that from 0:00 to 24:00 on June 2, there was one new case of asymptomatic infection (imported from Nigeria), and no new confirmed cases.

On June 4, the Zhejiang Provincial Health and Health Commission reported that from 04:00 on June 3, there was 1 new confirmed case (imported from Egypt) and 8 new asymptomatic infections (including 1 imported from Nigeria and 3 imported from Gabon). For example, 1 case was imported from Cameroon, 2 cases were imported from Egypt, and 1 case was imported from Chad.

On June 4, the Information Office of the Zhejiang Provincial Government held the 73rd press conference to report. As of 24:00 on June 3, there were 30 confirmed cases in Zhejiang Province being treated in hospital, and 45 asymptomatic infections were still under medical observation. For example, all imported from abroad.

On June 6, the Zhejiang Provincial Health and Health Commission reported that from 0:00 to 24:00 on June 5, there was 1 new confirmed case (converted from an asymptomatic infection imported from Egypt) and 1 new asymptomatic infection (Indonesia input).

On June 7, the Zhejiang Provincial Health Commission reported that there were 2 new confirmed cases between 00:00 and 24:00 on June 6 (both asymptomatic infections imported from abroad were confirmed).

On June 8, the Zhejiang Provincial Health and Health Commission reported that from 0:00 to 24:00 on June 7, there were 2 new cases of asymptomatic infection (including 1 case imported from Cameroon and 1 case imported from Sudan), and no new confirmed cases.

On June 10, the Zhejiang Provincial Health and Health Commission reported that from 0:00 to 24:00 on June 9, there was 1 new confirmed case (imported from Italy) and 3 new asymptomatic infections (including 1 imported from Nigeria and 1 imported from Ukraine). Example, 1 imported case was from Hungary.

July
On July 1, the Zhejiang Provincial Health Commission reported that from 0:00 to 24:00 on June 30, there was one new case of asymptomatic infection (imported from Malta), and no new confirmed cases.

On July 6, the Zhejiang Provincial Health and Health Commission reported that from 0:00 to 24:00 on July 5, there was one new case of asymptomatic infection (imported from the UK), and no new confirmed cases.

On July 9, the Zhejiang Provincial Health and Health Commission reported that from 0:00 to 24:00 on July 8, there was one new case of asymptomatic infection (imported from Taiwan), and no new confirmed cases.

On July 10, the Zhejiang Provincial Health Commission reported that from 0:00 to 24:00 on July 9, there was one new case of asymptomatic infection (imported from Cambodia), and no new confirmed cases.

On July 13, the Zhejiang Provincial Health and Health Commission reported that from 0:00 to 24:00 on July 12, there was one new case of asymptomatic infection (imported from Jamaica), and no new confirmed cases.

On July 14, the Zhejiang Provincial Health and Health Commission reported that from 0:00 to 24:00 on July 13, there was one new case of asymptomatic infection (imported from Nigeria), and no new confirmed cases.

On July 15, the Zhejiang Provincial Health and Health Commission reported that from 04:00 on July 14, there were 2 new confirmed cases (both imported from Indonesia), and 2 new asymptomatic infections (including 1 each imported from Spain and Mexico).

August
On August 1, the Zhejiang Provincial Health and Health Commission reported that from 04:00 on July 31, there was 1 new confirmed case (confirmed from an asymptomatic infected person previously imported from Sudan) and 3 new asymptomatic infected cases (among them, 1 case was imported from the UAE, 1 case was imported from Nigeria, and 1 case was imported from Cameroon).

On August 2, the Zhejiang Provincial Health and Health Commission reported that from 0:00 to 24:00 on August 1, there were 2 new cases of asymptomatic infection (both imported from Spain), and no new confirmed cases.

On August 4, the Zhejiang Provincial Health and Health Commission reported that from 04:00 on August 3, there were 2 new confirmed cases (both asymptomatic infections imported from Spain were confirmed), and 1 new asymptomatic infection (Spanish input).

On August 6, the Zhejiang Provincial Health and Health Commission reported that there were 4 new cases of asymptomatic infection from 0:00 to 24:00 on August 5 (including 2 cases imported from Sudan, 1 case imported from Chad, and 1 case imported from Morocco). No new confirmed cases.

On August 7, the Zhejiang Provincial Health and Health Commission reported that from 04:00 on August 6, 1 new confirmed case (confirmed from an asymptomatic infected person imported from Morocco) and 2 new asymptomatic infected cases (among them, 1 case was imported from Egypt and 1 case was imported from Cameroon).

On August 8, the Zhejiang Provincial Health and Health Commission reported that from 0:00 to 24:00 on August 7, there were 3 new cases of asymptomatic infection (including 1 case imported from Pakistan, 1 case imported from Morocco, and 1 case imported from Spain). No new confirmed cases.

On August 9, the Zhejiang Provincial Health and Health Commission reported that from 00:00 to 24:00 on August 8, there was 1 new confirmed case (imported from Japan).

September
On September 1, the Zhejiang Provincial Health and Health Commission reported that from 04:00 on August 31, there was 1 new confirmed case (imported from Brazil) and 3 new asymptomatic infections (including 1 imported from Colombia and 1 imported from Tanzania). For example, 1 imported case was from Taiwan).

On September 2, the Zhejiang Provincial Health and Health Commission reported that from 04:00 on September 1, there was 1 new confirmed case (imported from Indonesia) and 4 new asymptomatic infections (including 3 imported from Nigeria and 1 from Kazakhstan).

On September 3, the Zhejiang Provincial Health Commission reported that from 04:00 on September 2, there was 1 new confirmed case (imported from Spain) and 3 new asymptomatic infections (including 2 imported from Japan and 1 imported from Ethiopia).

On September 4, the Zhejiang Provincial Health and Health Commission reported that there were 4 new confirmed cases between 00:00 and 24:00 on September 3 (all were asymptomatic infections imported from abroad before being confirmed).

On September 5, the Zhejiang Provincial Health and Health Commission reported that from 00:00 to 24:00 on September 4, there was one new case of asymptomatic infection (imported from South Korea), and no new confirmed cases.

On September 6, the Zhejiang Provincial Health Commission reported that from 0:00 to 24:00 on September 5, there were 2 new cases of asymptomatic infection (both imported from Guyana), and no new confirmed cases.

On September 7, the Zhejiang Provincial Health and Health Commission reported that from 04:00 on September 6, there was one new confirmed case (the asymptomatic infected person imported from Kazakhstan was re-designated as a confirmed case).

October
On October 1, the Zhejiang Provincial Health Commission reported that from 00:00 to 24:00 on September 30, there was one new case of asymptomatic infection (imported from Georgia), and no new confirmed cases.

On October 2, the Zhejiang Provincial Health and Health Commission reported that from 00:00 on October 1 to 24:00, there was 1 new confirmed case (imported from Mexico).

On October 3, the Zhejiang Provincial Health and Health Commission reported that from 00:00 on October 2 to 24:00, there were 4 new cases of asymptomatic infection (including 3 cases imported from Japan and 1 case imported from Mexico), and no new confirmed cases.

On October 4, the Zhejiang Provincial Health and Health Commission reported that from 00:00 to 24:00 on October 3, there was 1 new confirmed case (confirmed from an asymptomatic infected person imported from Mexico).

On October 5, the Zhejiang Provincial Health Commission reported that from 04:00 on October 4, there were 2 new cases of asymptomatic infection (both imported from Egypt), and no new confirmed cases.

On October 7, the Zhejiang Provincial Health and Health Commission reported that from 04:00 on October 6, there was 1 new confirmed case (imported from the United States) and 1 new asymptomatic infection (imported from Tanzania).

November
On November 1, the Zhejiang Provincial Health and Health Commission reported that from 00:00 to 24:00 on October 31, there were 9 new confirmed cases, including 1 case in Hangzhou (a confirmed case in Shangrao that was intercepted by a train passing through Hangzhou in a neighboring province and city, according to the assisted investigation notification) close contacts), 8 cases imported from abroad (all were previously imported asymptomatic infected persons and confirmed), and 2 new cases of asymptomatic infected cases (including 1 case imported from Mexico and 1 case imported from the United Kingdom).

On November 2, the Zhejiang Provincial Health and Health Commission reported that from 0:00 to 24:00 on November 1, there were 3 new confirmed cases (all of which were previously imported asymptomatic infections from overseas and transferred to confirmed cases), and 1 new asymptomatic infection (Tanzania input).

On November 3, the Zhejiang Provincial Health and Health Commission reported that from 0:00 to 24:00 on November 2, there was 1 new confirmed case (confirmed from an asymptomatic infected person imported from Russia) and 1 new asymptomatic infected person (Tanzania input).On the same day, a case of nucleic acid positive for the new coronavirus was detected in the preliminary screening of the personnel at the isolation point in Tongxiang City, and it was the second close contact of the local close contact, Cao Moumou (isolated in Hebei).

On November 4, the Zhejiang Provincial Health and Health Commission reported that from 00:00 to 24:00 on November 3, there were 3 new cases of asymptomatic infection, including 1 case in Jiaxing City (a close contact with confirmed cases in other provinces) and 2 cases imported from abroad (both Imported from Cameroon), no new confirmed cases.

On November 6, the Zhejiang Provincial Health and Health Commission reported that from 00:00 to 24:00 on November 5, there were 2 new cases of asymptomatic infection (including 1 case imported from the United Arab Emirates and 1 case imported from Russia), and no new confirmed cases.

December
On December 1, the Zhejiang Provincial Health and Health Commission reported that from 00:00 to 24:00 on November 30, there were 2 new cases of asymptomatic infection (including 1 case imported from Mexico and 1 case imported from Uganda), and no new confirmed cases.

On December 5th, the Zhejiang Provincial Health and Health Commission reported that from 00:00 to 24:00 on December 4th, there was one new case of asymptomatic infection (imported from Ukraine), and no new confirmed cases.

On December 6, the Zhejiang Provincial Health and Health Commission reported that from 00:00 to 24:00 on December 5, there were 2 new cases of asymptomatic infection (including 1 imported from Singapore and 1 imported from Spain), and no new confirmed cases.On December 6, 3 cases of COVID-19 nucleic acid test positive were found in Zhenhai District, Ningbo City, Zhejiang Province, and they were sent to designated hospitals for isolation treatment.

On December 7, the Zhejiang Provincial Health and Health Commission reported that from 04:00 on December 6, there was 1 new confirmed case (Ningbo City) and 3 new asymptomatic infections (including 2 cases in Ningbo City and 1 case imported from Mexico).On the same day, two new confirmed cases were confirmed in Hangzhou, one of which was a close contact of a case outside the city, A positive case of preliminary screening was found in Shangyu District, Shaoxing City.Two more positive cases were initially screened.

On December 8, the Zhejiang Provincial Health Commission reported that there were 8 new confirmed cases (including 2 in Hangzhou, 5 in Ningbo, and 1 in Shaoxing) between 00:00 and 24:00 on December 7, and 7 new asymptomatic infections (including 2 cases in Hangzhou City, 3 cases in Ningbo City, 1 case imported from Singapore, and 1 case imported from Spain).

On December 9, the Zhejiang Provincial Health and Health Commission reported that from 00:00 to 24:00 on December 8, there were 12 new confirmed cases (including 3 in Ningbo and 9 in Shaoxing), and 13 new asymptomatic infections (including 1 case in Hangzhou, 3 cases in Ningbo, 8 cases in Shaoxing, 1 case imported from South Korea).

On December 10, the Zhejiang Provincial Health and Health Commission reported that from 00:00 to 24:00 on December 9, there were 6 new confirmed cases (including 2 cases in Ningbo City, 3 cases in Shaoxing City, and asymptomatic infections imported from South Korea before 1 case was confirmed), 23 new cases of asymptomatic infection (including 7 in Hangzhou, 7 in Ningbo, and 9 in Shaoxing).

On December 11, the Zhejiang Provincial Health Commission reported that there were 35 new confirmed cases between 00:00 and 24:00 on December 10, including 4 cases in Hangzhou City (all were previously asymptomatic infections transferred to confirmed cases), 14 cases in Ningbo City (among them, 9 cases of asymptomatic infections were transferred to confirmed cases), 17 cases in Shaoxing City (including 7 cases of asymptomatic infections transferred to confirmed cases), and 13 new cases of asymptomatic infections (including 1 case in Hangzhou City, 5 cases in Ningbo City, and 7 cases in Shaoxing City).

On December 12, the Zhejiang Provincial Health and Health Commission reported that from 00:00 to 24:00 on December 11, 38 new confirmed cases were added, including 8 cases in Hangzhou City (including 5 cases of asymptomatic infections), 8 cases in Ningbo City, 22 cases in Shaoxing City (including 15 cases of asymptomatic infection transferred to confirmed cases), 9 new cases of asymptomatic infection (including 1 case in Hangzhou City and 8 cases in Shaoxing City).

References

2021 in Zhejiang
Timelines of the COVID-19 pandemic by country
zh:2019冠状病毒病浙江省疫情时间线 (2021年)